Lady Dior is a commercial name given to a handbag by the Christian Dior company in honor of Diana, Princess of Wales.

History 
In 1995, Bernadette Chirac wished to give the Princess of Wales a unique handbag on the occasion of her visit to Paris. When France's first lady contacted Dior in her search for such a bag, the House offered her a model unofficially named Chouchou at the time. It was officially rechristened Princesse in the short term.

The bag, black in color, was presented to the former Lady Diana at the inauguration of the Cézanne exhibition at the Grand Palais. It was often photographed carried by Diana at public events: she had it with her in Birmingham during an official visit; again a few weeks later during a stay in Argentina; then on several further occasions. Her accessories also signified true appreciation of luxury, beyond expected brands to be worn by a British princess, and her personal relationships with the world's most prestigious houses. It was soon being described as "iconic", and "legendary", and was launched in larger series, with its name changed to Lady Dior. Two hundred thousand models were sold in two years and Dior's leather goods turnover increased tenfold. The bag in turn gave its name to a watch in 1999 and inspired a makeup product by Parfums Christian Dior.

Characteristics 
Lady Dior is a handbag that adopts Dior's graphic codes and is generally decorated with a cannage (caning) motif inspired by two items of furniture found in Dior's private mansion on Avenue Montaigne since 19473: the Napoléon III chairs on which the couturier seated the guests at his runway shows,  and the back of a neo-Louis XVI  medallion armchair Louis XV. The bag is composed of one hundred and forty four  pieces in total and is rectangular and rigid, with the four gold- or silver-tone D-I-O-R letters and the Dior logo suspended from the handle as charms. It is available in different materials featuring various techniques (leather, velvet, microfiber, satin, denim, python, crocodile, tweed, jacquard, etc.), and in several sizes.

An iteration of the bag called Lady D-Lite was introduced by the fashion house in 2019, which features a reversible and removable shoulder strap. It was notably carried by Diana's daughter-in-law, Meghan, Duchess of Sussex, at an event in 2021.

Advertising 

Chosen by designer John Galliano, French actress Marion Cotillard became the face of Lady Dior in 2008, a role she played until 2017.

In addition to multiple publications in the press photos by Peter Lindbergh, Craig McDean, Tim Walker and Jean-Baptiste Mondino, Marion Cotillard has appeared in several short film commercials mainly intended to be  released on the internet. The first was The Lady Noire Affair made by Olivier Dahan, followed by Lady Rouge by Jonas Åkerlund. The latter followed a series of photos by Annie Leibovitz. Next came Lady Blue Shanghai, a sixteen-minute film by David Lynch. Two more films, Lady Grey London, with Ian McKellen, and L.A.dy Dior were made by John Cameron Mitchell. The actress recalled,"I suggested this director to Dior. They didn't know him, but they haven't wanted to let him go since!"

The CEO of Christian Dior Couture, Sidney Toledano, has said of these short films that the "strategic objective is to make people dream by telling beautiful stories".

In 2012, Cotillard starred in the web-series Lady Dior Web Documentary and wrote and performed the song "Lily's body" for one episode. She also designed her own handbag for Lady Dior, the "360° bag".

In 2014, Cotillard wrote and co-directed alongside Eliott Bliss, a music video for her song "Snapshot in LA", especially for Lady Dior's campaign "Enter The Game – Dior Cuise 2015".

Exhibition 
Organized by Dior, a touring exhibition six years in the making and entitled Lady Dior As Seen By  traveled to China, Japan, Italy, and Brazil  from 2012 onwards. It presented over a hundred works by photographers – the likes of Patrick Demarchelier, Bruce Weber and Ellen Von Unwerth – visual artists, sculptors, designers and painters, all inspired by the Lady Dior bag. As all the collaboration with famous artists,  Lady Dior has been seen as the bond of art and fashion.

Celebrity ambassadors
 Carla Bruni (1996)
Monica Bellucci (2006–2007)
 Marion Cotillard (2008–2017)

See also 
 Diorissimo

Notes and references

Notes

References

Further reading

External links 
 
 
  

Dior
Bags (fashion)
LVMH brands